Domenach is a French surname. Notable people with the surname include:

 Jean-Luc Domenach (born 1945), French historian, sinologist, and political scientist
 Jean-Marie Domenach (1922–1997), French writer and intellectual

See also
 Domenech

French-language surnames